Avant Bard Theatre (commonly known as Avant Bard, and formerly known as WSC Avant Bard, Washington Shakespeare Company or simply WSC) is a small, primarily non-Equity theater based in Arlington, VA. The company was founded in 1990 under the name Washington Shakespeare Company; its name was changed to WSC Avant Bard in August 2011; its name was subsequently changed to Avant Bard Theatre in October 2017. Avant Bard focuses on producing "bold and experimental productions of classic and contemporary works".

History

Avant Bard began as an Arlington (County) Arts Incubator project in 1990, along with Signature Theatre, New Works Theatre, and Goosebump Theatre. The company's inaugural production, a sold-out run of Jean-Paul Sartre's No Exit in September 1990, was also the inaugural production in the Gunston Arts Center, a former junior high school library which had just been renovated as a performing arts center by the Arlington Department of Parks, Recreation and Community Resources.

The company performed in the Clark Street Playhouse, an abandoned warehouse converted into a black box theater, from 1995 until the end of the 2009-2010 season, when the building was scheduled for demolition to make way for development on the north end of Crystal City. (The demolition of the theater had been "imminent" as early as the 2005-2006 season, but the closure of the building was postponed from year to year.) In the fall of 2010, Avant Bard became the theater-in-residence in Arlington's Artisphere, the former site of the Newseum; however, the company was evicted in December, 2012, in the middle of the 2012-2013 season, when Artisphere decided to restructure the use of its facilities. Since then, the company has staged productions in a number of DC venues, including Theatre on the Run, managed by the Arlington (County) Cultural Affairs Division; the Callan Theatre on the campus of the Catholic University of America; and the Gilbert C. Eastman Studio Theatre on the campus of Gallaudet University.

Avant Bard has had three Artistic Directors. The first, Brian Hemmingsen, was Artistic Director from 1990 until 1996. Christopher Henley, who was also one of the founding members of the company, was Artistic Director from 1996 until February 2013. Tom Prewitt was Artistic Director from February 2013 until his passing in November 2020. The first play which Prewitt directed as Artistic Director was Pinter's No Man's Land, with Hemmingsen and Henley in the lead roles (Hirst and Spooner, respectively). In February 2021 Avant Bard formed a collaborative leadership team of five producing partners: Sara Barker, Megan Behm, Alyssa Sanders, DeMone Seraphin, and Dina Soltan.

Notable productions

Over the course of several months in 2005, the company presented Bard-37: Our Canon Cabaret as a celebration of the company's fifteenth season. Each of Shakespeare's plays was given a reading, in chronological order. Portions of Hamlet were read in Klingon, the first of  Avant Bard's forays into presenting Shakespeare "in the original language."

In July/August, 2005, Steven Scott Mazzola directed a production of Royal Hunt for the Sun, by Peter Shaffer.

In February, 2006, John Vreeke directed a production of Death and the King's Horseman, by Nigerian playwright and author Wole Soyinka.

In July, 2007, Jose Carrasquillo directed a version of Macbeth performed entirely in the nude. Critical reviews were mixed, but the production drew national attention: according to USA Today, the production drew some of the company's largest audiences, and the run was extended.

In November, 2012, Tom Prewitt (shortly before being named Artistic Director) directed a production of Six Characters in Search of an Author, by Luigi Pirandello. The production featured Brian Hemmingsen, the company's founding director, in the role of the Father.

In October/November, 2014, Tom Prewitt directed the world premier of Visible Language, a musical with book and lyrics by Mary Resing, and music by Andy Welchel. Musical direction was by Elisa Rosman, and Aaron Kubey was Director of Artistic Sign Language. The production was co-produced by the Gallaudet University theater department, with a number of Gallaudet faculty and students in the cast. The performances took place in Gallaudet's Eastman Studio Theatre. The action interweaves three plot lines: the conflict between Edwin Miner Gallaudet and Alexander Graham Bell on the future of the education of the deaf; Gallaudet's efforts to get Congress to fund a Teacher's College at Kendall Green (which became Gallaudet University); and Bell's initial meeting with Helen Keller, whom he taught to speak using his Visible Speech method. The musical requires most of the cast to be bilingual (English and ASL), and the performances had surtitles throughout.

In September 2015, Avant Bard presented Friendship Betrayed by María de Zayas, a Spanish Golden Age playwright  in a translation by Catherine Larson, based on the edition by Valerie Hegstrom. The play was produced in conjunction with the Women's Voices Theater Festival, but it wasn't an official entry because it was not a premiere.

In May 2017, Avant Bard presented Shakespeare's King Lear, featuring prominent DC actor Rick Foucheaux in the title role. This production marked Foucheaux's retirement from acting full time.

Performances in Klingon

Avant Bard has a history of presenting performances in Klingon (tlhIngan Hol), owing to the fact that Marc Okrand, the inventor of Klingon, is President of Avant Bard's Board of Directors.

In 2005, as part of its Bard-37 Canon Cabaret, a series of readings of the entire Shakespeare canon presented in chronological order over several months, the reading of Hamlet included passages read in the original Klingon.

On September 25, 2010, the company presented By Any Other Name: An Evening of Shakespeare in Klingon, which included scenes from Much Ado About Nothing and Hamlet. Guest star George Takei joined the company, reciting a monologue from Julius Caesar (in English only).
 
Subsequent to this performance, the company was contacted by the BBC, who wanted to film it for Fry's Planet Word, a documentary series about language written and presented by Stephen Fry. George Takei did not reprise his appearance, but Fry himself took part in the Klingon version of the final scene of Hamlet, playing the role of Osric in costume. This performance took place on February 27, 2011.

Avant Bard then presented a sequel, Shakespeare in Klingon: The Wrath of (Michael) Kahn, on March 4, 2012. This presentation featured a guest appearance by Michael Kahn (not Khan), the longtime Artistic Director of the Shakespeare Theatre Company, a large Equity company in downtown Washington, which features productions of Shakespeare and other classic playwrights. The similarity of the companies' two names has occasionally caused confusion for people unfamiliar with one or the other company.

Most recently, Avant Bard presented a staged reading of A Klingon Christmas Carol at the District of Columbia Jewish Community Center's Theatre J, on December 15, 2014. This performance featured Marc Okrand, inventor of the Klingon language (and president of the company's Board of Directors), as Scrooge (SQuja').

Scripts in Play Festival

In 2016, Avant Bard announced its first Scripts in Play festival. Over the course of several weeks, the company presents readings of plays, often with an eye to mounting full productions in an upcoming season. In the spring of 2016, during the first festival, Avant Bard presented TAME., by Jonelle Walker, written as a response to The Taming of the Shrew. (The play is stylized as all capitals with a following period.) The play had been a hit in the 2014 Fringe Festival, and it was given a full stage production as part of the 2016-2017 season.

Over the years, several other festival plays have received full productions:
The Good Devil (in Spite of Himself), a Commedia Dell'Arte farce by Mario Baldessari and Tyler Herman;

Emilie: La Marquise du Châtelet Defends Her Life Tonight, by Lauren Gunderson, which received its regional premiere in 2017;

Illyria, or What You Will, an adaptation of Twelfth Night by Jonelle Walker and Mitchell Hébert, set in a 1980s Manhattan underground queer club.

The production of Ada and the Engine, another Scripts in Play presentation, was cancelled because of the COVID-19 pandemic, but was rescheduled for March 2022.

Recognition and awards

In 2011-2012 and in 2015-2015, Avant Bard was selected as "one of the best small charities in the greater Washington region" by the Greater Washington Catalogue for Philanthropy.

Mary Goldwater Awards

The Mary Goldwater Awards were presented by the Theatre Lobby between 1987 and 2006. Given from a trust fund established by alumni of the Theatre Lobby company, the awards "were given for theatrical excellence without regard to category. If the Judges thought it appropriate, they would give the Award to more than one artist in a given category. Or to none." The Theatre Lobby gave between two and ten awards a year.

Helen Hayes Awards

Avant Bard has been awarded a number of Helen Hayes Awards.

Note: Starting in 2014, the nominations for Helen Hayes Awards were split into two groups: the Helen Group, for non-Equity productions; and the Hayes Group, for Equity productions. Each award category is awarded for both groups.

See also

Helen Hayes Award
Theater in Washington D.C.

References

External links
Avant Bard official website
Greater Washington Catalogue for Philanthropy

Theatre companies in Virginia